Christian I of Saxony (29 October 1560 in Dresden – 25 September 1591 in Dresden) was Elector of Saxony from 1586 to 1591. He belonged to the Albertine line of the House of Wettin.

He was the sixth but second surviving son of Elector Augustus of Saxony and Anna of Denmark. The death of his older brother, Alexander (8 October 1565), made him the new heir apparent to the Electorate of Saxony.

Christian succeeded his father when he died, in 1586. His chancellor was Nikolaus Krell. During his reign, the first measurement was made of the Electorate of Saxony by Matthias Oeder. Later, the work of Oeder was continued by Balthasar Zimmermann until 1633 and completed as far as possible.

In 1591 his wife organised a set of 12 suits of armour that she planned to give him as a Christmas present. A number of the suits survive.

Family
In Dresden on 25 April 1582, Christian married Sophie, daughter of John George, Elector of Brandenburg. They had seven children:
Christian II (b. Dresden, 23 September 1583 – d. Dresden, 23 June 1611), successor of his father as Elector.
John George I (b. Dresden, 5 March 1585 – d. Dresden, 8 October 1656), successor of his brother as Elector.
Anna Sabine (b. Dresden, 25 January 1586 – d. Dresden, 24 March 1586).
Sophie (b. Dresden, 29 April 1587 – d. Stettin, 9 December 1635), married on 26 August 1610 to Duke Francis I of Pomerania.
Elisabeth (b. Dresden, 21 July 1588 – d. Dresden, 4 March 1589).
Augustus (b. Dresden, 7 September 1589 – d. Naumburg, 26 December 1615), married on 1 January 1612 to  Elisabeth of Brünswick-Wolfenbüttel. This marriage was childless.
Dorothea (b. Dresden, 7 January 1591 – d. Quedlinburg, 17 November 1617), Princess-Abbess of Quedlinburg (1610).

Ancestry

References

Literature

Ilse Schunke: Beitraege zur Politik des Kurfürsten Christian I. v. Sachsen 1586-1591 vornehmlich in den Jahren 1586/89, Munich, 1922

External links

1560 births
1591 deaths
Nobility from Dresden
Prince-electors of Saxony
House of Wettin
Albertine branch
Burials at Freiberg Cathedral